Johannes de Garlandia or John of Garland was a medieval grammarian and university teacher. His dates of birth and death are unknown, but he probably lived from about 1190 to about 1270.

He was born in England, and studied at Oxford and then at the medieval University of Paris, where he was teaching by 1220. He lived and taught on the Left Bank at the Clos de Garlande, after which Rue Galande is named. This is the origin of the name by which he is usually known.  The main facts of his life are stated in his long poem De triumphis ecclesiae ("On the triumphs of the Church").

In 1229, he was one of the first Masters of the new University of Toulouse.  His poem Epithalamium Beatae Mariae Virginis was presented in 1230 to the Papal legate Romanus de Sancto Angelo, one of the founders of the university.  He was in Toulouse during the turbulent events of 1229–1231 (see Albigensian Crusade), which he describes in De Triumphis. After the death of bishop Foulques of Toulouse in 1231, the Cathars regained influence at Toulouse, university teachers ceased to be paid, and many considered it too dangerous to remain in the city. Johannes de Garlandia was one of those who escaped, disguising himself as a serf or slave.

He returned to Paris, where Roger Bacon heard him lecture. He was still there in 1245, writing his poem De triumphis ecclesiae; he finished it in 1252. He was probably still alive in 1270.

Garland's grammatical works were much used in England, and were often printed by Richard Pynson and Wynkyn de Worde. He was also a voluminous Latin poet. The best known of his poems beside the De Triumphis Ecclesiae is Epithalamium beatae Mariae Virginis, contained in the same manuscript. Among his other works are his Dictionarius, a Latin vocabulary, the title of which is the origin of the word dictionary in English and several other languages; Compendium totius grammatices printed at Deventer in 1489; and two metrical treatises, entitled Synonyma and Equivoca, frequently printed at the close of the 15th century.

A treatise on alchemy, Compendium alchimiae, often printed under his name, was by a 14th-century writer named Ortolanus (Martin Ortolan, or Lortholain). The 11th century writings on computus by Garlandus have occasionally been attributed to Johannes de Garlandia.

His works include many virulent passages about Jews.

Works
 Ars lectoria ecclesiae, sive Accentarium (c. 1248)
 Commentaria in Doctrinali Alexandri de Villa-Dei
 Commentarius (1246)
 Compendium grammaticae; Clavis compendii (c. 1234)
 Composita verborum
 De mysteriis ecclesiae (1245)
 De orthographia
 De triumphis ecclesiae (1252)
 Dictionarius (c. 1220) 
 Dictionarius metricus
 Distigium, sive Cornutus
 Epithalamium beatae Mariae virginis (1230)
 Equivoca
 Exempla honestae vitae
 Integumenta super Ovidii Metamorphosin (c. 1234)
 Liber de constructionibus
 Miracula beatae Mariae virginis, sive Stella maris, sive Liber metricus (c. 1248)
 Morale scolarium, sive Opus satiricum (1241)
 Nomina et verba defectiva
 Parisiana poetria de arte prosaica, metrica et rhythmica (c. 1234)
 Stella Maris
 Synonyma
 Unum omnium
 Verba deponentalia

Lost works
 Assertiones fidei (c. 1230)
 Conductum de Tholosa (c. 1230)
 Georgica spiritualia (c. 1230)
 Gesta apostolica (c. 1230)
 Memoriale (c. 1234)

References

Editions

 F. Ghisalberti, ed., Integumenta Ovidii. Messina, Milan, 1933.
 Thomas Haye, ed. Johannes de Garlandia. Compendium Grammaticae. Cologne: Böhlau, 1995.
 Ewald Könsgen, ed. and trans. Johannes de Garlandia. Carmen de misteriis Ecclesie. With commentary by Peter Dinter. Mittellateinische Studien und Texte 32. Leiden: Brill, 2004.
 Traugott Lawler, ed. and trans. The Parisiana Poetria of John of Garland. New Haven: Yale University Press, 1974.
 Traugott Lawler, ed. and trans. Parisiana poetria. Dumbarton Oaks Medieval Library 65. Cambridge, MA: Harvard University Press, 2020.
 Elsa Marguin-Hamon, ed. and trans. L’Ars lectoria Ecclesie de Jean de Garlande. Une grammaire versifiée du xiiie siècle et ses gloses. Turnhout, Brepols, 2003 (Studia Artistarum : Subsidia, 2)
 Elsa Marguin-Hamon, ed. and trans. La 'Clavis Compendii' de Jean de Garlande. Turnhout: Brepols, 2009.
 L.J. Paetow, ed. Two Medieval Satires on the University of Paris: La Bataille des VII Ars of Henri d'Andeli and the Morale Scolarium of John of Garland. Berkeley: University of California Press, 1927. [Latin and English, with biobibliography]
 Antonio Saiani, ed. and trans. Giovanni di Garlandia. Epithalamium beate virginis Marie. Testo critico, traduzione e commento. Florence: L.S. Olschki, 1995. 
 Auguste Scheler, Lexicographie latine du XIIe et du XIIIe siècles: trois traités de Jean de Garlande, Alexandre Neckam et Adam du Petit-Pont (Leipzig: F.A. Brockhaus 1867)
 
 E.F. Wilson, ed. The Stella Maris of John of Garland. Edited together with a Study of Certain Collections of Mary Legends made in Northern France in the Twelfth and Thirteenth Centuries. The Medieval Academy of America, Cambridge, MA, 1946

Further reading

 Histoire littéraire de la France, vols. viii., xxi., xxiii. and xxx.; 
 Gustave Brunet, Manuel du libraire.
 G.L. Bursill-Hall, « Johannes de Garlandia : Forgotten grammarian and the manuscript tradition », Historiographia Linguistica III/2, 1976, pp. 155-177.
 G.L. Bursill-Hal, « Johannes de Garlandia : Additional manuscript material », Historiographia Linguistica VI/1, 1979, pp. 77-86.
 M. L. Colker, « New evidence that John of Garland revised the Doctrinale of Alexander de Villa Dei », Scriptorium 28, 1974, pp. 68-71.
 Y. Dossat, « Les premiers maîtres à l'université de Toulouse : Jean de Garlande, Hélinand », Cahiers de Fanjeaux V, 1970, p. 179-190.
J. A. Fabricius, Bibliotheca Latina mediae et infimae aetatis vol. iii. (1754)
 A. Grondeux, E. Marguin, 'L'œuvre grammaticale de Jean de Garlande (ca 1195–1272 ?), auteur, réviseur et glosateur: un bilan' in Histoire Epistémologie Langage vol. 21 (1999) pp. 133–163.
 Tony Hunt, ‘Les gloses en langue vulgaire dans les mss. de l’Unum Omnium de Jean de Garlande’  in Revue de linguistique romane vol. 43 (1979) pp. 162–78.
 – "giving a list also of the works on alchemy, mathematics and music, rightly or wrongly ascribed to him." (Enc. Britt. 1911)
 P. Meyer, La Chanson de la croisade contre les Albigeois, vol. ii. pp. xxi–xxiii. (Paris, 1875–1879)
 F. J. E. Raby, A History of Christian-Latin Poetry (1927) p. 386 ff.
 A.G. Rigg, A History of Anglo-Latin Literature 1066–1422 (Cambridge: Cambridge University Press, 1992), 163–176.
 John Edwin Sandys, A History of Classical Scholarship i. (1906) 549. ** 1903 ed., p. 527f
 I. Rosier, « John of Garland », in Stammerjohann, H. (éd.), Lexicon Grammaticorum, Who's who in the History of World Linguistics, 481, Tubingen,Niemeyer, 1996
 E. F. Wilson, "The Georgica Spiritualia of John of Garland" in Speculum vol. 8 (1933) p. 358 ff.

Attribution

English non-fiction writers
Grammarians of Latin
13th-century Latin writers
Rhetoricians
English lexicographers
Medieval linguists
1190s births
1270s deaths
Medieval Latin poets
Alumni of the University of Oxford
University of Paris alumni
Education in Toulouse
People of the Albigensian Crusade
English male poets
English male non-fiction writers